Mamadou N'Diaye is the name of:

Mamadou N'Diaye (athlete) (1939-2008), Senegalese Olympic sprinter
Mamadou N'Diaye (basketball, born 1975), Senegalese basketball player
Mamadou N'Diaye (basketball, born 1993), Senegalese basketball player
Mamadou N'Diaye (footballer, born 1984), Senegalese footballer
Mamadou N'Diaye (footballer, born 1986), Senegalese footballer
Mamadou N'Diaye (footballer, born 1995), Senegalese footballer
Mamadou N'Diaye (footballer, born 1996), Senegalese footballer